de Monroy is a surname of Spanish origin. Notable people with the surname include:

 Hernán Cortés de Monroy y Pizarro (1485–1547), Spanish conquistador
 Rodrigo de Monroy y Almaraz, 5th Lord of Monroy (15th century), Spanish nobleman

Surnames of Spanish origin